Life Is What You Make It is a 2017 documentary film which explores the life of award-winning Filipino theatre producer Jhett Tolentino from his migration into the United States and his entry into theatre production in New York. The film came with a soundtrack album entitled Life Is What You Make It: Original Motion Picture Soundtrack.

Soundtrack
The song "Life Is What You Make It" served as the documentary's main theme. The song won the Silver Medal at the Global Music Awards in San Diego and was nominated Song of the Year at the Josie Awards in Nashville, Tennessee in 2017.

Accolades

See also 
 Broadway theatre
 Here Lies Love (musical)
 National Artist of the Philippines
 Musical theatre

References

External links
 Jhett Tolentino shared autobiography in documentary film
 Cinematografo Film Festival 2017 
 Life Is What You Make It: Official Music Video

2017 films
American documentary films
Documentary films about theatre
2010s English-language films
2010s American films